Thunderer was the first of a pair of steam locomotives (the other being Hurricane) built for the Great Western Railway (GWR), England, by R. & W. Hawthorn & Co. whose design was very different from other locomotives. In order to meet Isambard Kingdom Brunel's strict specifications, an 0-4-0 frame carried the 'engine', while the boiler was on a separate six-wheeled frame. The driving wheels were geared 10:27 in order to reduce the cylinder stroke speed while allowing high track speed, in line with the specifications.

The locomotive was delivered to the GWR on 6 March 1838 and ceased work in December 1839 after running only , but its boiler section was kept as a stationary boiler.

See also
GWR Hurricane locomotive - the second Hawthorn locomotive
GWR Haigh Foundry locomotives - further geared locomotives

References

 
 

Thunderer
Broad gauge (7 feet) railway locomotives
0-4-0 locomotives
Early steam locomotives
Steam locomotives of Great Britain
Hawthorn locomotives
Railway locomotives introduced in 1838
Scrapped locomotives